Anacithara angulicostata is a species of sea snail, a marine gastropod mollusk in the family Horaiclavidae.

Description
The length of this violaceous-pink to yellow shell varies between 3.9 mm and 4.4 mm.

Distribution
This marine species is endemic to South Africa and occurs off KwaZulu-Natal.

References

 Kilburn, R. N. "Turridae [sl](Mollusca: Gastropoda) of southern Africa and Mozambique. Part 7. Subfamily Crassispirinae, section 2." Annals of the Natal Museum 35 (1994): 177–228.

External links
  Tucker, J.K. 2004 Catalog of recent and fossil turrids (Mollusca: Gastropoda). Zootaxa 682:1-1295.

Endemic fauna of South Africa
angulicostata
Gastropods described in 1994